The Central Vermont Railroad Pier is a historic pier on State Pier Road in New London, Connecticut.  Built in 1876, it originally served as an interchange point between ocean-going freighters and the rail network of the Central Vermont Railroad.  It is believed to be the only 19th-century pier in Connecticut.  The pier was listed on the National Register of Historic Places in 2005.

Description and history
The Central Vermont Railroad Pier is located north of downtown New London, extending southward from Winthrop Point, a protrusion into the Thames River.

The pier was built in 1876 by the Central Vermont Railroad, which served central Massachusetts, Vermont, and parts of Canada.  It is a rare surviving example of a 19th-century intermodal freight facility, and is believed to be the only remaining 19th-century pier in the state.  The facility was at first used by the railroad for the transshipment of coal, with use gradually expanded to include other types of freight.  Rail lines were run down the center of the pier, with goods offloaded from freighters directly onto trains.  Facilities that once stood on the pier include coal loading equipment and storage bunkers; these and other facilities were removed in the decades after the railroad ended its use of the pier in 1946.

See also
National Register of Historic Places listings in New London County, Connecticut

References

External links

Railway buildings and structures on the National Register of Historic Places in Connecticut
Transport infrastructure completed in 1876
Buildings and structures in New London, Connecticut
Railway buildings and structures on the National Register of Historic Places
National Register of Historic Places in New London County, Connecticut
Piers in Connecticut
Piers on the National Register of Historic Places
Industrial buildings and structures on the National Register of Historic Places in Connecticut
Transportation buildings and structures in New London County, Connecticut